Zofia Czajkowska (4 August 1905, Tarnów – April 1978, Tarnów) was a Polish musician chosen to be the first conductor of the Women's Orchestra of Auschwitz.  

Czajkowska had been a music teacher, prior to her arrest as a political prisoner. According to Susan Eischeid, author of The Truth about Fania Fénelon and the Women’s Orchestra of Auschwitz-Birkenau. Czajkowska was regarded by many as an "unexceptional musician". Like the other musicians in the orchestra, Czajkowska was a captive, whose service in the orchestra helped prevent them from being murdered. In July 1943 Alma Rosé, a talented musician, and niece of Gustav Mahler, arrived in the camp and took over leading the orchestra. Czajkowska served as Rosé's lieutenant.

References

Polish conductors (music)
Auschwitz concentration camp prisoners
20th-century Polish musicians
People from Tarnów
1905 births
1978 deaths